Qamata is a small town in Intsika Yethu Municipality, Chris Hani District (formerly St. Mark's District), Eastern Cape Province, South Africa. From 1963 to 1994 it was part of the semi-autonomous Transkei, and before that of western Tembuland. Qamata is located on Route R61 and on the Qamata River.

Qamata was the birthplace of Matanzima brothers whom are former Transkei leaders Kaiser and George, and it was where he lived on probation after being released from gaol on corruption charges in 1987.

Notes

Populated places in the Intsika Yethu Local Municipality
Transkei